The Outlaw's Daughter is a 1954 American Western film directed by Wesley Barry and written by Samuel Roeca. The film stars Bill Williams, Sheila Connolly, Jim Davis, George Cleveland, Sara Haden, Elisha Cook, Jr. and Nelson Leigh. The film was released on November 1, 1954, by 20th Century Fox.

Plot

Cast    
Bill Williams as Jess Raidley aka Big Red
Sheila Connolly as Kate Dalton 
Jim Davis as Marshal Dan Porter
George Cleveland as Lem Creel
Sara Haden as Mrs. Merril
Elisha Cook, Jr. as Lewis 'Tulsa' Cook
Nelson Leigh as Jim Dalton
Guinn "Big Boy" Williams as Moose
George Barrows as 'Rock' Swenson

References

External links 
 

1954 films
American Western (genre) films
1954 Western (genre) films
20th Century Fox films
Films scored by Raoul Kraushaar
Films directed by Wesley Barry
1950s English-language films
1950s American films